Emmet Kirwan is an Irish actor, playwright and screenwriter. He is known for starring in RTÉ2's Sarah & Steve and for writing and starring in the 2015 play, and 2018 movie version of Dublin Oldschool. Other credits include parts in Ella Enchanted, '71 and Inside I'm Dancing. In 2012 he performed Just Saying, a monologue written and directed by Dave Tynan, which to date has received over 500,000 views on YouTube.

References

External links 

Living people
21st-century Irish male actors
Male actors from County Dublin
Irish male film actors
Irish male dramatists and playwrights
Irish male television actors
Irish screenwriters
Irish male stage actors
Year of birth missing (living people)
People from South Dublin (county)